
A second-hand shop is a shop which sells used goods.

Temporary venues 
People will sell used goods right in front of their home in what is called a "garage sale". The products would be set up in front of the garage.

In the UK, people buy and sell at a car boot sale. Sellers will drive their vehicles to a large field, laden with products both used and new, and sell out of their boot.

Current businesses 
 Goodwill Industries - Runs Goodwill Stores throughout North America as well as 16 other countries. 
 The Salvation Army - Christian-based thrift store operator that sells second-hand items.
 Oxfam bookshops - second-hand bookstore in the U.K.
 Value Village - second-hand shops in the U.S.

Websites that facilitate second-hand resale 
eBay - Website that allows people or retailers to sell new or used products
Craigslist - Website that allows people or retailers to sell or give away goods and services, primarily targeted to the local community.

See also 
Antique shop - sells the same type of goods, either of better quality or with rarity value, consequently charging much higher prices. The distinction between junk and antiques is not always clear-cut.
Car dealership - new car dealers in certain countries offer pre-owned cars with variable quality and price. There are also dealers who sell only used cars. 
Car boot sale
Consignment - consignment shop is the North American term for a second-hand shop.
Flea market
Give-away shop - everything is given away at no cost. Some operate as swap shops and require the customer to donate merchandise.
Junk shop - sells all kinds of old goods. Some junk shops are piled high to encourage browsing and bargain hunting. These shops also sell low-quality antiques.
Music store - some music stores sell used, vintage or collectible instruments and sound gear, often using a consignment model. 
Thrift store - similar to a junk shop but set up to fund a specific charity. These tend to specialise in clothes. The quality of the clothes donated for sale depends on the surrounding area. In the United States, these are called thrift stores.
Office furniture shop - sells mainly used goods. They are common, but lack a distinctive name.
Pawn shop - sells used items that were pawned or sold by individuals
Record shop - many independent record stores sell used CDs, DVDs, Blu-Ray discs, vinyl records, etc.
Resale boutique - specializes in contemporary high-end used designer fashion, vintage clothing, or contemporary basics
Surplus store - often sells military surplus supplies.
Used bookstore - sells used books and other publications. Second-hand bookshops are a mainstay of book towns.
Video game store - most stores that specialize in video games sell second-hand video game consoles, video games, and accessories, in addition to new products.
Jumble sale
Wrecking yard, scrapyard, wrecking yard - sells used automotive parts

References

Retail formats
Reuse